Jervi Li (born August 9),  also known as KaladKaren or KaladKaren Davila, is a Filipino actor, TV host, endorser, impersonator, LGBT rights advocate and television personality most known for her impression of ABS-CBN news anchor, Karen Davila.

Education and career
Jervi graduated from the University of the Philippines, Diliman in Quezon City as Magna Cum Laude in her degree program BA Broadcast Communication. She was also a member of UP SAMASKOM (Samahan ng mga Mag-aaral sa Komunikasyon).

In 2016, Jervi impersonated Karen Davila in the Philippine presidential election, as part of a political satire event led by the University of the Philippines. She co-hosted the morning talk show of ABS-CBN Umagang Kay Ganda, and pioneered digital shows as presenter for Pilipinas Got Talent Exclusives, The Voice Kids Digi TV, The Voice Teens Digi TV and Trabahanap. She was also a mainstay of the program I Can See Your Voice and currently a resident judge on Drag Race Philippines.

Filmography

Television

Film

References

Living people
The Amazing Race contestants
Drag Race Philippines
Filipino television personalities
Filipino women
Filipino LGBT artists
Filipino LGBT entertainers
Transgender women
Year of birth missing (living people)